Loch Dochart  is a small freshwater loch on the Lochdochart Estate in Stirling, Scottish Highlands. There is a small wooded island in the middle of the loch on which stands the ruins of a castle originally built by Sir Duncan Campbell between 1583 and 1631.

The loch was surveyed on 11 May, 1902 by T.N. Johnston and James Parsons and later charted  as part of Sir John Murray's The Bathymetrical Survey of Fresh-Water Lochs of Scotland 1897-1909.

References

Dochart
Dochart
LDochart